Gene Makowsky (born April 17, 1973) is a Canadian politician and former Canadian football offensive lineman who has been a member of the Saskatchewan Legislative Assembly representing the riding of Regina Gardiner Park since 2016 and prior to that representing the riding of Regina Dewdney.

Prior to his service in the Legislative Assembly of Saskatchewan Makowsky played 17 seasons for the Saskatchewan Roughriders of the Canadian Football League.

Early life
Born in Saskatoon, Saskatchewan, Makowsky graduated from high school at Walter Murray Collegiate in 1991.

University of Saskatchewan
During his 4 years at the University of Saskatchewan, Makowsky helped the U of S Huskies to two Hardy Cup Championships, as well as being named to the Canada West All Star team in 1994. He was selected 23rd overall by the Saskatchewan Roughriders in the 1995 CFL Draft.

CFL career

Makowsky played 17 seasons in the CFL—all with the Saskatchewan Roughriders. He earned the CFL's Most Outstanding Offensive Lineman Award in 2004 and 2005 and was a finalist for the award in 2008. He was a 5 time CFL All Star and a West Division All Star for seven consecutive years (2004 through 2010). On August 5, 2011, Makowsky made history, playing in his 272nd game, surpassing Roger Aldag for most games played by a Saskatchewan Roughrider.

After Saskatchewan defeated the Winnipeg Blue Bombers in the 2007 Grey Cup game, Makowsky was presented the Grey Cup by Commissioner Mark Cohon.

Makowsky retired from the CFL on February 17, 2012, after playing in 16 playoff games, 4 Grey Cup games, and a Saskatchewan Roughrider record 284 regular season games. In 2015, he was inducted into the Canadian Football Hall of Fame.

Political career
Makowsky was elected as a member of the Legislative Assembly of Saskatchewan in the 2011 provincial election, representing the constituency of Regina Dewdney. He was re-elected in the 2016 provincial election in the newly created electoral district of Regina Gardiner Park.  Makowsky is a member of the Saskatchewan Party.

Popular culture
Makowsky, along with his then teammate Matt Dominguez, made a cameo appearance in the Corner Gas episode
"Reader Pride".

Cabinet positions

References

1973 births
Living people
21st-century Canadian politicians
Canadian Football Hall of Fame inductees
Canadian football offensive linemen
Canadian sportsperson-politicians
Members of the Executive Council of Saskatchewan
Players of Canadian football from Saskatchewan
Politicians from Regina, Saskatchewan
Politicians from Saskatoon
Saskatchewan Huskies football players
Saskatchewan Party MLAs
Saskatchewan Roughriders players
Sportspeople from Regina, Saskatchewan
Sportspeople from Saskatoon